I Want To Work For Diddy was a reality show on VH1. Co-executive produced and directed by Mark Jacobs, the 13 contestants are brought together to see who can become Sean Combs' assistant. The show premiered on August 4, 2008. In the end, Suzanne Siegel was chosen to be his assistant and Mic Barber was hired in an undisclosed role.

Contestants

Judges 
 Kevin Liles – Executive Vice President of Warner Music Group
 Norma – Vice President, Cipriani
 Capricorn Clark – Marketing Director, Sean John
 Phil Robinson – Diddy's former manager

Weekly Results

 Teams
 The contestant was on the Uptown team.
 The contestant was on the Downtown team.
 The contestant was not on any team.

 Competition
 The contestant won.
 The contestant was eliminated, but still hired.
 The contestant won the challenge and was safe.
 The contestant lost the challenge but was safe.
 The contestant was eliminated. 
 The contestant was in the bottom two, but was not eliminated.

 Notes
 Laverne was originally was on the Downtown Team, but joined the Uptown Team in Episode 5.
 There were no eliminations.
 In Episode 7, Kim and Stefanie switched teams.
 In Episode 8, the teams were Boris & Stefanie, Kendra & Mic and Kim & Suzanne.
 Stefanie was eliminated after the presentations.

Episodes

Welcome to Bad Boy
First aired August 4, 2008

Eliminated: Andrew
Challenge: The Art of Multitasking
Downtown: 31 tasks completed
Uptown: 31 tasks completed
Tiebreaker: Downtown Team was given the win because Uptown Team didn't keep all of their receipts and came up $147.62 short. 
Challenge Winner: Downtown Team
Bottom 2: Georgette, Kim
Eliminated: Georgette
Elimination Notes: The first elimination took place after the personal interviews when teams were being formed.  Andrew is eliminated solely based on his breakdancing.

No Bitchassness
First aired August 11, 2008

Challenge: No Bitchassness Allowed
Tiebreaker: Both teams failed to complete the course; Downtown Team was given the win for being the closest to the end. 
Challenge Winner: Downtown Team
Bottom 2: Kim, Rob
Eliminated: Rob

Go Get the Model
First aired August 18, 2008

Challenge: Go Find the Model: Create Print Ad for Sean John Eyewear
Challenge Winner: Uptown Team
Bottom 2: Boris, Deon
Eliminated: Deon

Diddy.com
First aired August 25, 2008

Challenge: Press Play: The Viral Video Challenge
Downtown: 54.6% of total views
Uptown: 45.4% of total views
Challenge Winner: Downtown Team
Bottom 2: Brianna, Red
Eliminated: Brianna

Hooray for Hollywood
First aired September 1, 2008

Challenge: Hooray for Hollywood: Assist Diddy’s Family
Challenge Winner: Uptown Team
Bottom 2: Boris, Kendra
Eliminated: None
Elimination Notes: Laverne was switched to the Uptown Team.

Unforgivable Hustle
First aired September 8, 2008

Challenge: The Unforgivable Hustle
Downtown: 15 bottles of perfume sold
Uptown: 11 bottles of perfume sold
Challenge Winner: Downtown Team
Bottom 2: Kim, Laverne
Eliminated: Laverne

One Night Only
First aired September 15, 2008

Challenge: The Art of Celebration
Challenge Winner: Downtown Team
Bottom 2: Red, Stefanie
Eliminated: Red

New York Hustle
First aired September 22, 2008

Challenge: All About the Benjamins: The Money Hustle
Boris & Stefanie: $98.64
Kendra & Mic: $27.42
Kim & Suzanne: $452.86
Challenge Winners: Kim, Suzanne
Bottom 2: Boris, Kendra
Eliminated: Boris, Kendra
Elimination Notes: Having spared Boris and Kendra from elimination in Episode 5, the judges decided to eliminate both of them.

Show Me the Monae
First aired September 29, 2008

Challenge: Plan a Showcase for Janelle Monáe
Eliminated: Kim
Elimination Notes: With only four contestants remaining, team competitions were eliminated and it became a 1-versus-all format; Diddy fired Kim after getting into an argument with her.

Season Finale
First aired October 6, 2008

Challenge: Plan a Showcase for Janelle Monáe
Eliminated:  Stefanie
Winner: Mic
Winner: Suzanne
Elimination Notes: Stefanie was eliminated after the presentations; Mic was hired in an undisclosed role following his elimination.

Season 2 
A second season of I Want to Work for Diddy was confirmed by VH1. The second season premiered on November 2, 2009.

References

External links 
 

2008 American television seasons